Chhapadeshwar Mahadev Mandir is an ancient Shiv Temple located in Kharkhoda, Sonipat district. Each year, on the occasion of Mahashivratri a huge gathering of devotees takes place in the temple . According to the history books it was the part of Khandava Forest pandavas stayed  in Mahabharata times.

References 

Hindu temples in Haryana
Sonipat district